Vladimír Gombár (born 27 September 1961 in Stropkov) is a Slovak football coach.

References

1961 births
Living people
Slovak footballers
Slovak football managers
1. FC Tatran Prešov players
FK Dukla Banská Bystrica players
FC Lokomotíva Košice players
1. FC Tatran Prešov managers
People from Stropkov
Sportspeople from the Prešov Region
Association football midfielders